World Demise is the fourth album by American death metal band Obituary. It was released on September 6, 1994. A music video was made for the track "Don't Care".

Production

Of note, World Demise was the last album recorded with long-time producer Scott Burns.

Musical style

While remaining, at the core, a death metal band, there's definite changes in Obituary's overall sound. World Demise has, in general, a slower pace and more groove-oriented beats. The band also increased the use of sampling.

Track listing
All songs written and arranged by Obituary.

Personnel
John Tardy - vocals
Allen West - lead guitar
Trevor Peres - rhythm guitar
Frank Watkins - bass
Donald Tardy - drums

References

Bibliography

 Mudrian, Albert. (2004). Choosing Death: The Improbable History of Death Metal & Grindcore. Port Townsend, WA: Feral House. 
 Obituary (1994). World Demise. [CD]. New York, NY: Roadrunner Records. The Obituary Remasters (1998).

External links
World Demise at Media Club

1994 albums

Obituary (band) albums
Roadrunner Records albums
Albums produced by Scott Burns (record producer)
Albums recorded at Morrisound Recording